Herbert Augustus Strong (24 November 1841 – 13 January 1918) was an Australian scholar, professor of comparative philology and logic at the University of Melbourne.

Early life
Strong was born at Clyst St Mary near Exeter, England the third
 
son of Rev. Edmond Strong and his wife Sarah, née Forbes-Coulson.

Strong was educated at Winchester School and Corpus Christi College, Oxford, graduating B.A. in 1863 having taken a first-class in classical moderations the year before. From 1866-71 Strong was assistant to professor of humanity, George Ramsay, at the University of Glasgow, and was the first warden of University Hall, University of Glasgow.

Career in Australia
In 1872, Strong was appointed professor of classical and comparative philology and logic at the University of Melbourne, replacing Martin Howy Irving. Strong's opportunities were not great as the university was still young, there being then four other professors and fewer than 150 full-time students; ten years later the students still numbered under 300. Strong, however, identified himself with the life of the university, encouraged athletics and the formation of a university spirit. Strong also advocated the cultivation of French and German in addition to the classics.

Liverpool
In 1884 Strong became professor of Latin at the newly founded University College in Liverpool and held the chair until his retirement in 1909. He wrote the words to the song 'Salvete Cives Nostri' composed by Albert Lister Peace, this song was performed at the Opening Ceremony of the Victoria Building in 1892 and was known as the University College song. While at Liverpool he was president of the Liverpool Royal Institution and Liverpool guild of education, president of the French Society of Liverpool, and president of the University Athletic Club for 20 years. Strong was examiner of secondary schools for the Scottish education department for 20 years. In addition to minor educational works and editions of Latin poets Catullus and Juvenal, Strong wrote with Kuno Meyer an Outline of a History of the German Language (1886), and with W. S. Logeman and B. I. Wheeler an Introduction to the Study of the History of Language (1891). Strong died in England on 13 January 1918. He was given the honorary degree of LL.D. at Glasgow in 1890. Strong was married twice: to Helen Campbell Edmiston and Isobel, née White. Strong was survived by two sons, one of who was Sir Archibald Strong.

References

External links
 

1841 births
1918 deaths
Academic staff of the University of Melbourne
People from Exeter
People educated at Winchester College
Alumni of Corpus Christi College, Oxford
English philologists
Academics of the University of Glasgow
Academics of the University of Liverpool